The Lambek–Moser theorem is a mathematical description of partitions of the natural numbers into two complementary sets. For instance, it applies to the partition of numbers into even and odd, or into prime and non-prime (one and the composite numbers). There are two parts to the Lambek–Moser theorem. One part states that any two non-decreasing integer functions that are inverse, in a certain sense, can be used to split the natural numbers into two complementary subsets, and the other part states that every complementary partition can be constructed in this way.  When a formula is known for the  natural number in a set, the Lambek–Moser theorem can be used to obtain a formula for the  number not in the set.

The Lambek–Moser theorem belongs to combinatorial number theory. It is named for Joachim Lambek and Leo Moser, who published it in 1954, and should be distinguished from an unrelated theorem of Lambek and Moser, later strengthened by Wild, on the number of primitive Pythagorean triples. It extends Rayleigh's theorem, which describes complementary pairs of Beatty sequences, the sequences of rounded multiples of irrational numbers.

From functions to partitions

Let  be any function from positive integers to non-negative integers that is both non-decreasing (each value in the sequence  is at least as large as any earlier value) and unbounded (it eventually increases past any fixed value).
The sequence of its values may skip some numbers, so it might not have an inverse function with the same properties. Instead, define a non-decreasing and unbounded integer function  that is as close as possible to the inverse in the sense that, for all positive integers ,

It follows from either of these definitions that .

More strongly, each of these two functions maps its argument  to the th member of its set in the partition.

As an example of the construction of a partition from a function, let , the function that squares its argument.
These two functions give  and 
2, 6, 12, 20, 30, 42, 56, 72, 90, 110, ...
1, 3, 4, 5, 7, 8, 9, 10, 11, 13, 14, ....
These two sequences are complementary: each positive integer belongs to exactly one of them.

From partitions to functions

The second part of the Lambek–Moser theorem states that this construction of partitions from inverse functions is universal, in the sense that it can explain any partition of the positive integers into two infinite parts.

One of the simplest examples to which this could be applied is the partition of positive integers into even and odd numbers. They form an inverse pair, and the partition generated via the Lambek–Moser theorem from this pair is just the partition of the positive integers into even and odd numbers. Another integer partition, into evil numbers and odious numbers (by the parity of the binary representation) uses almost the same functions, adjusted by the values of the Thue–Morse sequence.

Limit formula

meaning that this sequence eventually becomes constant and the value it takes when it does 

Lambek and Moser used the prime numbers as an example, following earlier work by Viggo Brun and D. H. Lehmer. If  is the prime-counting function (the number of primes less than or equal  then the  non-prime (1 or a composite number) is given by the limit of the sequence

For some other sequences of integers, the corresponding limit converges in a fixed number of steps, and a direct formula for the complementary sequence is possible. In particular, the  positive integer that is not a  power can be obtained from the limiting formula as

History and proofs
The theorem was discovered by Leo Moser and Joachim Lambek, who published it in 1954. Edsger W. Dijkstra has provided a visual proof of the result, and later another proof based on algorithmic reasoning. Yuval Ginosar has provided an intuitive proof based on an analogy of two athletes running in opposite directions around a circular racetrack.

Related results

For non-negative integers
A variation of the theorem applies to partitions of the non-negative integers, rather than to partitions of the positive integers. For this variation, every partition corresponds to a Galois connection of the ordered non-negative integers to themselves. This is a pair of non-decreasing functions

Rayleigh's theorem

See also
Hofstadter Figure-Figure sequences, another pair of complementary sequences to which the Lambek–Moser theorem can be applied

Notes

References

; Solutions by Beatty, A. Ostrowski, J. Hyslop, and A. C. Aitken, vol. 34 (1927), pp. 159–160, 
, as cited by 

Integer sequences
Theorems in number theory